This is a list of different types of earthquake.

A 
 Aftershock, a smaller earthquake that occurs after a previous large earthquake, in the same area of the main shock

B 
 Blind thrust earthquake, an earthquake which occurs along a thrust fault that does not show signs on the Earth's surface.

C 
 Cryoseism, a seismic event that may be caused by a sudden cracking action in frozen soil or rock saturated with water or ice

D 
 Deep-focus earthquake, also called a plutonic earthquake, an earthquake with a hypocenter depth exceeding

E 
 Earthquake swarm, events where a local area experiences sequences of many earthquakes striking in a relatively short period of time

F 
 Foreshock, an earthquake that occurs before a larger seismic event (the mainshock) and is related to it in both time and space

H 
 Harmonic tremor, a sustained release of seismic and infrasonic energy typically associated with the underground movement of magma, the venting of volcanic gases from magma, or both

I 
 Induced seismicity, typically minor earthquakes and tremors that are caused by human activity that alters the stresses and strains on the Earth's crust
 Interplate earthquake, an earthquake that occurs at the boundary between two tectonic plates
 Intraplate earthquake, an earthquake that occurs within the interior of a tectonic plate

M 
 Megathrust earthquake, an earthquake occurring at subduction zones at destructive convergent plate boundaries, where one tectonic plate is forced underneath another

R 
 Remotely triggered earthquakes, a result of the effects of large earthquakes at considerable distance, outside of the immediate aftershock zones

S 
 Slow earthquake, a discontinuous, earthquake-like event that releases energy over a period of hours to months, rather than the seconds to minutes characteristic of a typical earthquake
 Submarine earthquake, an earthquake that occurs underwater at the bottom of a body of water, especially an ocean
 Supershear earthquake, an earthquake in which the propagation of the rupture along the fault surface occurs at speeds in excess of the seismic shear wave (S-wave) velocity, causing an effect analogous to a sonic boom
 Strike-slip earthquake, an earthquake where two tectonic plates sliding past each other get caught, build tension, then slide free, creating an earthquake.

T 
 Tsunami earthquake, an earthquake that triggers a tsunami of a magnitude that is very much larger than the magnitude of the earthquake as measured by shorter-period seismic waves

V 
 Volcano tectonic earthquake, an earthquake induced by the movement (injection or withdrawal) of magma

External links

 
Seismology
Lists of earthquakes